Tatyana Marisol Ali (born January 24, 1979) is an American actress and singer best known for her role as Ashley Banks on the NBC sitcom The Fresh Prince of Bel-Air from 1990 to 1996. She starred as Tyana Jones on the TV One original series Love That Girl!, and played a recurring role as Roxanne on the CBS soap opera The Young and the Restless from 2007 to 2013.

Early life
Ali was born on January 24, 1979 in North Bellmore, New York. She is of mixed African and Indian descent or Dougla, born to an Indo-Trinidadian father and an Afro-Panamanian mother.

Career
In 1985, 6-year-old Ali began her acting career as a regular performer on the PBS children's educational program Sesame Street. Her tenure included an appearance with jazz great Herbie Hancock, who demonstrated his Fairlight CMI synthesizer using a sample of Ali's voice. She also appeared in two episodes of Star Search, one of which featured her performance of a cover of Marvin Gaye's and Tammi Terrell's hit "Ain't No Mountain High Enough".

She made her breakthrough in 1990 when she was cast as Ashley Banks on the NBC television sitcom The Fresh Prince of Bel-Air, a role she played throughout the series' entire run, from 1990 to 1996.

Ali's vocal talent was featured on several episodes of Fresh Prince in later seasons, prompting the show's star Will Smith to ask her if she would seriously consider pursuing a musical career. She ultimately decided, for the time being, to continue to concentrate on her acting career. In the series' final season, however, Ali performed several songs, and she began to be cleaned for her musical debut, the culmination of which was her debut album Kiss The Sky in 1998. It was certified gold in early 1999, only months after its release, and spawned the Rodney "Darkchild" Jerkins-produced hit single "Daydreamin'", released July 21, 1998, which peaked at No. 6 on the Billboard Hot 100 and also appeared on the UK Singles Chart. The album spawned two further UK hits, "Boy You Knock Me Out" featuring Will Smith—which peaked at No. 3 and is her biggest hit to date—and "Everytime", which was her third top-20 hit in the UK, peaking at No. 20. She made an appearance on Smith's album Willennium on the track "Who Am I" with MC Lyte. She performed the title song "Sunny Valentine" along with Terrence Quaites for the indie film Rockin' Meera in 2005. In early 2008, she performed on the song "Yes We Can", a will.i.am project supporting Barack Obama's presidential campaign. She also appeared in the subsequent music video, which garnered coverage on the "What the Buzz" segment of ABC's World News Now. In January 2014, Ali released an EP titled Hello, whose first single was "Wait For It", which she performed on The Arsenio Hall Show on February 4, 2014.

Apart from her musical career, Ali continued to land roles in films such as The Brothers, Glory Road, and Nora's Hair Salon (and its sequel), among others. From 2009 to 2010 she produced and starred in the BET web series Buppies. She was on recurring status on the CBS soap opera The Young and the Restless as Roxanne from 2007 to 2013. Ali starred in the TV One original series Love That Girl! as Tyana (whose name was derived from Ali's given name). In 2013, she co-starred as Maya in the BET comedy Second Generation Wayans, alongside Craig Wayans and Damien Dante Wayans.

In 2011, Ali received the Living Legacy Award from the Caribbean Heritage Organization in Los Angeles.

In July 2016, Ali sued Warner Bros. claiming that the company stole her idea for the show The Real after she pitched the concept in December 2012. The case was dismissed in February 2017.

Personal life
She dated actor Jonathan Brandis from 1995 to 1998.

Ali graduated from Marymount High School in 1997. Ali attended Harvard University, where she received a Bachelor of Arts in African-American Studies and Government in 2002. On a celebrity edition of the game show The Chase, which aired February 3, 2015, Ali stated that her major was political science.

She traveled the United States as a spokesperson for Barack Obama's 2008 presidential campaign, and headed voter registration drives at college campuses.

In March 2016, Ali revealed that she was engaged to Dr. Vaughn Rasberry, assistant professor of English at Stanford University, whom she had met on eHarmony, and they announced that they were expecting their first child. She and Rasberry married on July 17, 2016, in Beverly Hills, California. The couple has two sons.

Filmography

Film

Television

Discography

Studio albums

Extended plays

Singles

Other appearances

Awards and nominations

Caribbean Heritage Organization
 2011: Recipient, Living Legacy Award

NAACP Image Awards
 1996: Won, Outstanding Youth Actor/Actress – The Fresh Prince of Bel-Air
 1997: Nominated, Outstanding Youth Actor/Actress – The Fresh Prince of Bel-Air
 2010: Nominated, Outstanding Actress in a Daytime Drama – The Young and the Restless
 2011: Nominated, Outstanding Actress in a Comedy Series – Love That Girl!
 2011: Won, Outstanding Actress in a Daytime Drama – The Young and the Restless
 2012: Won, Outstanding Actress in a Daytime Drama – The Young and the Restless
 2012: Nominated, Outstanding Actress in a Comedy Series – Love That Girl!
 2013: Nominated, Outstanding Actress in a Comedy Series – Love That Girl!

Nickelodeon Kids' Choice Awards
 1996: Nominated, Favorite Television Actress – The Fresh Prince of Bel-Air

Young Artist Awards
 1991: Won, Outstanding Young Comedienne in a Television Series – The Fresh Prince of Bel-Air
 1992: Nominated, Outstanding Young Comedienne in a Television Series – The Fresh Prince of Bel-Air
 1993: Nominated, Outstanding Young Comedienne in a Television Series – The Fresh Prince of Bel-Air
 1994: Nominated, Outstanding Young Comedienne in a Television Series – The Fresh Prince of Bel-Air
 1995: Nominated, Outstanding Young Comedienne in a Television Series – Name Your Adventure

References

External links

 
 
 
 
 

1979 births
Living people
People from Bellmore, New York
Singers from New York (state)
Actresses from New York (state)
American child actresses
American child singers
American contemporary R&B singers
American film actresses
American television actresses
African-American actresses
Hispanic and Latino American actresses
American actresses of Indian descent
American women singers of Indian descent
American people of Panamanian descent
American people of Trinidad and Tobago descent
Harvard College alumni
20th-century American actresses
20th-century American singers
20th-century American women singers
20th-century African-American women singers
21st-century American actresses
21st-century American women singers
21st-century American singers
21st-century African-American women singers